Wayne Mills may refer to:

 Wayne Mills (British Army soldier) (20th century), British Army Corporal in the Bosnian War
 Wayne Mills (singer) (1969–2013), American country musician
 Wayne Mills (guitarist) (1972-
Present) Springfield, Ohio.